Lasionycta poca is a moth of the family Noctuidae first described by William Barnes and Foster Hendrickson Benjamin in 1923. It is found throughout the Rocky Mountains of Alberta, westward to the Coast Range in western British Columbia and southward in the Cascades to Okanogan County, Washington.

It is predominantly alpine and is most common near timberline, but occasional specimens are collected in nearby forest.

The wingspan is about 27 mm. Adults are on wing from mid-June through August.

External links
A Revision of Lasionycta Aurivillius (Lepidoptera, Noctuidae) for North America and notes on Eurasian species, with descriptions of 17 new species, 6 new subspecies, a new genus, and two new species of Tricholita Grote

Lasionycta
Moths of North America
Moths described in 1923